The Nellie Olesons is a sketch comedy group based in Los Angeles. The group's name comes from Laura Ingalls' rival Nellie Oleson on the television series Little House on the Prairie. The group began in New York City and has toured the United States and Canada. The group's short film The Nellie Olesons won the Audience Award for Best Short Video at Outfest in 1997. In 2005, the Nellie Olesons spent 2005 performing Older! Uglier! Meaner! at a variety of venues.

References
Preview:The Nellie Olesons, Shane MacDougall, EYE Magazine, 24 April 1997.
The Nellie Olesons LA Weekly
In Performance:Theater, The New York Times, 7 February 2007
Olesons opting for intelligence Now Toronto, 30 April 1997

External links
 The Nellie Olesons webpage

American comedy troupes
Sketch comedy troupes